Uncial 0182 (in the Gregory-Aland numbering), is a Greek uncial manuscript of the New Testament, dated paleographically to the 5th century.

Description 
The codex contains a small parts of the Gospel of Luke 19:18-20,22-24, on one parchment leaf (15 cm by 9 cm). The text is written in one column per page, 21 lines per page, in uncial letters.

The Greek text-text of this codex is mixed. Aland placed it in Category III.

Currently it is dated by the INTF to the 5th century. According to Karl Wessely it was found in Fayyum.

The codex currently is housed at the Papyrus Collection of the Austrian National Library (Pap. G. 39781) in Vienna.

See also 

 List of New Testament uncials
 Textual criticism

References

Further reading 

  – digitized manuscript
 

Greek New Testament uncials
5th-century biblical manuscripts
Biblical manuscripts of the Austrian National Library